Ureterocutaneostomy is a type of incontinent, cutaneous urinary diversion. It provides a basic urinary diversion for preventing ureteral obstruction. Ureterocutaneostomy is usually preferred in infants/children as a temporary diversion whose metabolic status is inadequate for reconstructive surgery or palliative care of bladder carcinoma patients. Main surgical technique involves dissection of ureter/ureters and creating a terminal or loop stoma to skin using ureter lumen. In case of bilateral obstruction, two ureter lumens can be connected using transureteroureterostomy technique or two separate stomas can be created.

References

Urologic surgery